Abdul Hassan may refer to:

Abdul Hassan (American lawyer) (born 1974), born in Guyana
Abdul Hassan (Libyan rebel), a Libyan rebel commander
Abdul Majid Hassan (1380–1408), Sultan of Brunei

See also